Guðfríður Lilja Grétarsdóttir (born 10 January 1972) is an Icelandic politician, a member of Althing. She is also a chess Woman International Master (WIM), she is the Icelandic national woman champion eleven times.

External links 
 Non auto-biography of Guðfríður Lilja Grétarsdóttir on the parliament website

Living people
Gudfridur Lilja Gretarsdottir
Gudfridur Lilja Gretarsdottir
1972 births
Icelandic female chess players